The Dimaukom Mosque or Pink Mosque is a mosque in Datu Saudi Ampatuan, Maguindanao, the Philippines. The mosque's construction was financed by then-Mayor Samsudin Dimaukom under the administration of President Noynoy Aquino. The land where the mosque was built was a property of the mayor's family. The mosque was painted pink to symbolize peace and love and was built by Christian workmen to symbolize unity and inter-faith brotherhood.

See also
 Islam in the Philippines

References

Mosques completed in 2014
21st-century mosques
Mosques in Mindanao
Buildings and structures in Maguindanao del Norte
2014 establishments in the Philippines
21st-century architecture in the Philippines